Amphilius ruziziensis is a species of fish in the family Amphiliidae, first found in the Ruzizi River drainage, as well as the northeastern tributaries of Lake Tanganyika.

References

ruziziensis
Fish of Burundi
Fish described in 2015
Taxa named by Lawrence M. Page